Baduleh (also Romanized as Bādūleh; also known as Bārdulī) is a city in Kaki District of Dashti County, Bushehr province, Iran. At the 2006 census, its population was 3,558 in 755 households, when it was a village. The following census in 2011 counted 3,680 people in 927 households. The latest census in 2016 showed a population of 4,028 people in 1,097 households, by which time Baduleh had been elevated to the status of a city.

References 

Cities in Bushehr Province
Populated places in Dashti County